Taft High School, also known as Taft High 7–12, is a public high school and middle school located in Lincoln City, Oregon, United States. It is one of five high schools in the Lincoln County School District. It serves students from seventh through twelfth grade. It is named for Taft, one of the communities that combined to form Lincoln City in 1965.

Notable alumni
 Agnes Baker Pilgrim (1942), spiritual elder of the Takelma Tribe and chairperson of the International Council of 13 Indigenous Grandmothers.
 Gary Stevens (1959), former president of the Alaska Senate.

References

High schools in Lincoln County, Oregon
Educational institutions established in 1998
Public middle schools in Oregon
Lincoln City, Oregon
Public high schools in Oregon
1998 establishments in Oregon